Henry Bagshaw may refer to:

 Harry Bagshaw (1859–1927), English cricketer
 Henry Bagshaw (divine) (1632–1709), English divine